St. Leonards Nunnery was a  house of Augustininian canonesses at Perth, Scotland, founded in the 13th century. After King Edward I of England's foray in Scotland in 1296, the Prioress swore fealty to him. The convent was annexed to the Carthusian Monastery at Perth by 1434 and was suppressed in 1438.

Elizabeth Dunbar, daughter of George I, Earl of March, was a prioress of the convent in the 14th-15th century.

References

History of Catholic monasticism
Christian religious orders established in the 13th century
Augustinian nunneries in Scotland
13th-century establishments in Scotland
Leonards
Former Christian monasteries in Scotland